Herring Networks Inc. is a media company based in San Diego, California. It was founded in 2003 by Robert Herring. Through its Herring Broadcasting division, the company owns and operates two cable networks: AWE Network (originally known as Wealth TV), an American lifestyle and entertainment cable network founded in 2004, and the far-right news service One America News Network (OAN or OANN), founded through a strategic partnership with The Washington Times in 2013.

References

Companies based in San Diego
2004 establishments in California
American companies established in 2004
Cable television companies of the United States
Television broadcasting companies of the United States